Flint station is an inter-modal transportation center in Flint, Michigan. It is served by Amtrak's  route, and doubles as the intercity bus station for Amtrak Thruway and Indian Trails, as well as the local city bus service, the Flint Mass Transportation Authority, who owns the station. The station was built as part of the Amtrak Standard Stations Program.

History
This is at least the fourth station along the Grand Trunk Western Railroad (GTW) line through Flint. The railroad line that now hosts the Blue Water arrived from Port Huron in 1871 and originally a wooden structure served as the passenger station.  A permanent stone and brick station replaced it in 1905, but was moved to Muskegon in 1927. The third GTW depot, located at 120 East 14th Street near Downtown Flint, was used by Amtrak until 1989 and demolished thereafter. The current station on M-54 (Dort Highway) provides easy access to I-69.

From 1982–2004, the station was served by the International Limited, which was operated jointly by Via Rail and Amtrak and ran between Chicago and Toronto.

See also
History of railroads in Michigan

References

External links

Amtrak stations in Michigan
Buildings and structures in Flint, Michigan
Railway stations in the United States opened in 1989
1989 establishments in Michigan
Transportation in Genesee County, Michigan